Vittiger is a genus of flies in the family Stratiomyidae.

Species
Vittiger schnusei Kertész, 1909

References

Stratiomyidae
Brachycera genera
Taxa named by Kálmán Kertész
Diptera of South America